South Main Street Residential Historic District may refer to:

South Main Street Residential Historic District (Little Rock, Arkansas), listed on the NRHP in Arkansas
South Main Street Residential Historic District (Statesboro, Georgia), listed on the NRHP in Georgia

See also
South Main Street Historic District (disambiguation)